Shimoga Subbanna or Shivamogga Subbanna (born as G. Subramanya, 14 December 1938 – 11 August 2022) was an Indian Sugama Sangeetha(Light Music) playback singer in the Kannada language. He received a national award for singing for the song Kaadu Kudure Odi Banditta in the film Kaadu Kudure. He was the first Kannadiga to win National Award for playback singing. Apart from being an exemplary singer and musician, he was also an advocate and a notary public.

Awards and honors
Subbanna received several awards and honors for his contributions to Sugama Sangeetha, some of which are listed below:

 National Film Award for Best Male Playback Singer in 1978 
 Kannada Kampu award in 2006
 Honorary doctorate from Kuvempu University in 2008
 Sundarashri Award in 2009

Death 
He died on 11 August 2022, at the age of 83, after suffering from a cardiac arrest.

References

External links
 
 

1938 births
2022 deaths
Singers from Karnataka
Indian male playback singers
Kannada playback singers
Kannada people
People from Shimoga
Film musicians from Karnataka
20th-century Indian singers
Best Male Playback Singer National Film Award winners
21st-century Indian singers
20th-century Indian male singers
21st-century Indian male singers